William Aspinwall may refer to:

William Aspinwall (1605–c. 1662), 17th-century resident of the Massachusetts Bay Colony
William Aspinwall (minister) (fl. 1648–1662), nonconformist English minister
William Aspinwall (physician) (1743–1823), American physician
William Henry Aspinwall (1807–1875), 19th-century American railroad businessman

See also
William Aspinall (disambiguation)